Atlanta helicinoidea is a species of sea snail, a holoplanktonic marine gastropod mollusk in the family Atlantidae.

Distribution
This species is seen near shore of East and South China Sea.。

Description
The maximum recorded shell length is 4 mm.

Habitat
Minimum recorded depth is 0 m. Maximum recorded depth is 0 m.

References

Atlantidae
Gastropods described in 1850
Taxa named by John Edward Gray